Richard Lewis Springthorpe (born 23 August 1949), known professionally as Rick Springfield, is an Australian-American musician and actor. He was a member of the pop rock group Zoot from 1969 to 1971, then started his solo career with his debut single, "Speak to the Sky", which reached the top 10 in Australia in mid-1972. When he moved to the United States, he had a No. 1 hit with "Jessie's Girl" in 1981 in both Australia and the US, for which he received the Grammy Award for Best Male Rock Vocal Performance. He followed with four more top 10 US hits: "I've Done Everything for You", "Don't Talk to Strangers", "Affair of the Heart" and "Love Somebody". Springfield's two US top 10 albums are Working Class Dog (1981) and Success Hasn't Spoiled Me Yet (1982).

As an actor, Springfield starred in the movie Hard to Hold in 1984 and the television series High Tide from 1994 to 1997. He appeared in supporting roles in Ricki and the Flash and True Detective (both 2015). He portrayed Dr Noah Drake on the daytime drama General Hospital (1981–83, 2005–08, 2012), returning in 2013 for the show's 50th anniversary with his son, actor Liam Springthorpe. He played a depraved version of himself in Californication (2009). In 2010, Springfield published his autobiography, Late, Late at Night: A Memoir. In 2016 he starred as Vince Vincente/Lucifer in season 12 of The CW series Supernatural. In 2012, he starred as himself in the TV show Hot in Cleveland episode 16 of season 3 titled "Everything Goes Better With Vampires". In 2017, he starred as Pastor Charles in the American Horror Story episode entitled "Winter of Our Discontent".

Early life
Rick Springfield was born Richard Lewis Springthorpe on 23 August 1949 in Guildford, a western suburb of Sydney. He is the son of Eileen Louise (Evennett) and Norman James Springthorpe, an Australian Army career officer. His maternal grandparents were English. When he was young, he lived at the army camp with his family in Broadmeadows, Victoria, Australia. At 14, he saw the Beatles perform at Festival Hall in Melbourne.

Career

Music

Springfield was 13 when he learned guitar. He joined various bands in England, where his father was stationed from 1958 to 1963, and several more after returning to Australia. In 1968, he was approached by bass guitarist Pete Watson to join his group Rockhouse. Later that year, Watson changed the band's name to MPD Ltd and, in October when Springfield was 19 years old, they toured South Vietnam to entertain Australian troops. Another member of MPD Ltd was Danny Finley (drummer). Upon returning to Australia, they formed Wickedy Wak. They were joined by Phil Blackmore on keyboards and Dick Howard. Go-Set journalist Ian "Molly" Meldrum produced Wickedy Wak's single, "Billie's Bikie Boys", with Beeb Birtles of pop rock group Zoot as a backing vocalist.

In September 1969, Springfield replaced Roger Hicks as lead guitarist and vocalist in Zoot, with Birtles on bass guitar and vocals, Darryl Cotton on lead vocals and guitar, and Rick Brewer on drums. Upon joining Zoot, Springfield adopted the "Think PinkThink Zoot" theme that had the band members dressed head to toe in pink satin. The publicity gimmick brought attention to the group and attracted numerous teenage girl fans; however it caused problems in establishing their credibility as serious rock musicians. Zoot's fifth single, "Hey Pinky", was written by Springfield. The group attempted to shake off their teeny-bopper image. They followed with a hard rock cover version of The Beatles' hit "Eleanor Rigby", which peaked at No. 4 on Go-Set's Top 40 in March 1971. Despite another hit single with "Freak" in April, which was written by Springfield, the band broke up in May.

Springfield signed with Sparmac Records and issued his debut solo single, "Speak to the Sky", in October, which peaked at No. 5 on the Go-Set singles chart. Sparmac label owner, Robie Porter, was also producer and manager for Springfield. After recording his debut album, Beginnings, in London, Springfield moved to the United States in mid-1972. Springfield provided all the songwriting, lead vocals, guitar, keyboard and banjo for the album. In August 1972 "Speak to the Sky" was issued in the U.S. by Capitol Records and peaked at No. 14 on the Billboard Hot 100 in September. Beginnings was the first of seven top 40 Springfield albums on the related Billboard 200. However, follow-up success was hampered by rumours that Capitol Records paid people to purchase Springfield's albums, which led to some radio stations boycotting his music.

In 1973, Springfield signed to Columbia Records and recorded his second album, Comic Book Heroes, which was also produced by Porter. In Australia, released on Porter's new label, Wizard Records, the album and its two singles failed to chart. Springfield was promoted as a teeny pop idol similar to David Cassidy and Donny Osmond. Springfield spoke of the teenybopper image in Circus Magazine in 1973. He said he was not sure how it happened. "Someone saw my photo and that was it." He went on to say that someone asked to take a photo of him in a white suit and thought that it was "a bit dull", so he took some crayons and "scrawled an R with a lightning bolt going through it ... which became my emblem." From September 1972 to September 1973, Springfield starred as "himself" in the ABC-TV Saturday morning cartoon series Mission: Magic!, for which he usually wrote and performed an original song in each episode. In 1974, he issued an Australia-only album, Mission: Magic!, which was "full of infectious bubblegum pop songs". His single, "Take a Hand", reached the U.S. top 50 in 1976. The single was taken from the album Wait for Night, which was issued by his new label, Chelsea Records. Soon after its release, the record company folded. During the late 1970s, he concentrated more on his acting career, guest-starring in several primetime TV dramas.

Springfield continued to write and record and, in 1981, released his next album, Working Class Dog. The album spawned the single "Jessie's Girl", a worldwide hit which peaked at No. 1 for two weeks in the U.S. on the Hot 100 and the Australian Kent Music Report singles chart. Springfield won the 1981 Grammy Award for Best Male Rock Vocal Performance. Working Class Dog reached No.7 on the Billboard 200. Another top 10 single from the album was the Sammy Hagar-penned "I've Done Everything for You". He had further success with the follow-up albums Success Hasn't Spoiled Me Yet (1982) and Living in Oz (1983). Springfield was frustrated with people in interviews mistaking him for Bruce Springsteen, expressed in the track "Bruce" on the album Beautiful Feelings (1984). In 1984, Springfield starred in his own movie, Hard to Hold, and recorded the majority of the material on the accompanying soundtrack. The soundtrack included a top-ten hit, "Love Somebody", as well as several moderately successful follow-up singles. However, the movie itself was not successful, and the soundtrack's success (though higher than that of the movie) paled in comparison to previous Springfield albums. Nonetheless, Springfield released his next album Tao in 1985, scoring several modest hits from this release, including "State of the Heart" and "Celebrate Youth". That same year, Springfield was one of several performers who participated in the Live Aid charity concert. Around this time, he took a brief hiatus from recording.

Springfield returned in 2020 via a one-off featured performance in the Coheed and Cambria single "Jessie's Girl 2", a sequel to the 1981 Springfield single "Jessie's Girl".

In 2021, Springfield started hosting a weekly radio show on Sirius XM's "80s on 8" Channel called 'Working Class DJ with Rick Springfield', the musician spins eight songs around a theme.

In 2021, Springfield joined Russell Morris and formed The Morris Springfield Project. The Morris Springfield Project released Jack Chrome and the Darkness Waltz in October 2021 which debuted at number 34 on the ARIA Charts.

Acting

Springfield made his acting debut on The Six Million Dollar Man on 30 October 1977, in an episode entitled "Rollback". In December, he appeared on The Hardy Boys/Nancy Drew Mysteries, portraying Ned Nickerson. On 20 January 1978, Springfield guest-starred on an episode of Wonder Woman titled "Screaming Javelin". The character he portrayed was Tom, the concerned fiancé of an Olympic gymnast who had been kidnapped by a megalomaniac. Later in 1978, Springfield played the character of Zac in Saga of a Star World, which was, with some differences, the pilot episode of the original Battlestar Galactica TV series. He also co-starred as Keith Stewart in episode 17 of season 4 ("Dwarf in a Helium Hat") on The Rockford Files and as Tommy Archer in episode 4 ("Murder on the Flip Side") of The Eddie Capra Mysteries in 1978. In 1979, he guest-starred on an episode of "The Incredible Hulk" entitled "The Disciple" as Michael Roark, a San Francisco police officer who must decide whether to avenge the death of his father who was also a police officer, or simply provide justice and capture the alleged criminal. In 1981, he became a soap opera star on General Hospital. He had signed a contract with RCA Records and already recorded the album Working Class Dog, which neither he nor his agent had expected would do very well, which is why Springfield took the soap role. But the song "Jessie's Girl" went to No. 1 and Springfield ended up both playing the role of Dr. Noah Drake from 1981 to 1983, while simultaneously going on tour with his band. The success of the song boosted the ratings of the show which, according to Springfield, "became the biggest show on TV for that summer". The fame from the show also boosted the sale of the song.
In 1984, Springfield made a full-length feature film titled Hard to Hold. In 1998, he played in the film Legion. He also wrote the soundtrack for Hard to Hold. In 1992, he played the title role in the short-lived ABC series Human Target, based on the DC Comics character of the same name. In 1989, he starred in the film Nick Knight, in which he played an 800-year-old vampire seeking a cure for his condition. The film was later remade as the first two episodes of the series Forever Knight. In 1991, he appeared in the made-for-TV movie Dying to Dance. In 1994 he starred in the series Robin's Hoods. From 1994 to 1997 he starred in the television series High Tide that ran for 69 episodes.

In addition to the roles on television and in film, Springfield also acted in musical theatre. In 1995, he was a member of the original Broadway cast of the musical Smokey Joe's Cafe. This Tony Award-nominated musical featured the songs of rock & roll songwriters Jerry Leiber and Mike Stoller. From February 2000 to December 2002, Springfield performed in EFX Alive! at the MGM Grand in Las Vegas, Nevada. Springfield starred in several episodes of the third season of Showtime's Californication. His first appearance was in episode 3 on 11 October 2009, in which he plays a "twisted version of himself"; a "hedonistic Rick Springfield" from the past. Springfield starred in "Ho'ohuli Na'au", an episode of Hawaii Five-0. He played the role of photographer Renny Sinclair.

In December 2005, Springfield was asked by the General Hospital producers to return to the show in his role as Dr. Noah Drake after a 23-year absence. His run was subsequently extended as a recurring guest star and not a full contract cast member until 2008. Springfield returned to General Hospital as Dr. Noah Drake in April 2013. Springfield also starred in "Everything Goes Better With Vampires", an episode of Hot in Cleveland. He played the role of a toll booth worker who pretended to be the famous singer/musician Rick Springfield in an attempt to impress women. Springfield had a recurring role on True Detective as Dr. Irving Pitlor, a psychiatrist. In 2015 Springfield appeared as Greg alongside Meryl Streep in the movie Ricki and the Flash. In 2016, Springfield was cast in the twelfth season of The CW series Supernatural where he played rocker Vince Vincente and Lucifer. In July 2016, Springfield appeared on ABC's Greatest Hits. In October 2017, Springfield appeared as Pastor Charles on FX's American Horror Story: Cult. In July 2018 Rick played himself on Episode 4 of the YouTube original series Sideswiped (TV series).

Personal life
When Springfield was 17, he attempted suicide by hanging himself. "I hang suspended for fifteen or twenty seconds and am just sliding into unconsciousness when the knot tying the rope to the beam somehow unravels. I'm slammed hard to the concrete floor, rather the worse for wear." Springfield has been dealing with depression for several decades. "I want them to have hope ... and know that the moment will pass," Springfield said in an exclusive interview with ABC News' Paula Faris. "I'm an example of the moment passing, because I've been there a couple of times, and haven't ... for want of a better phrase, pulled the trigger." 

From late 1974 to early 1976, Springfield was in a romantic relationship with actress Linda Blair, beginning when she was 15 and he was 25.

On 24 April 1981, his father, Norman James Springthorpe, died. 

In October 1984, Springfield married his girlfriend, Barbara Porter, at his family's church in Australia. They had met several years earlier when Springfield was recording Working Class Dog and she was working as the recording studio receptionist. They have two sons, Liam (born 1985) and Joshua (born 1989). In 1985, when his first son was born and after the release of his Tao album, Springfield took a break from his musical career to spend more time with his family and to deal with the depression that had affected him since his adolescence. 

At a concert at the House of Blues in Orlando, Florida, on 2 March 2006, Springfield announced he had become a US citizen and votes Republican.

In January 2018, Springfield stated in an interview that he contemplated suicide in 2017. "Last year I was close to it, really close to it," explained Springfield on how he considered killing himself. "When Robin Williams and Chester (Bennington) and Chris Cornell and those guys… I didn't go, 'Oh that's terrible.' I went, 'I get it.' I get being that lost and dark."

He practices Transcendental Meditation.

Memoir
Springfield's autobiography, Late, Late at Night: A Memoir, was released in 2010. In October, it peaked at No. 13 on The New York Times Best Seller list. In May 2014, Springfield published Magnificent Vibration: a novel, which also made The New York Times Best Seller list.

In August 2012, Late, Late at Night was named No. 23 of "The 25 Great Rock Memoirs of All Time" by Rolling Stone.

Songs referencing Springfield
In 1985, Jimmy Hart recorded the song "Eat Your Heart Out Rick Springfield", featured on The Wrestling Album. The premise of the song is that the object of Hart's affection seems to idolise Springfield to the point that Hart feels rivalled by him, prompting Hart to pick up singing as well in order to compete for his girl's affection. The song makes references to "Dr Noah Drake" as well as to "Jessie's Girl". In a 2014 interview, Springfield said that although he had heard the title and was aware of the song's existence and had met with Jimmy Hart in person, he had never actually heard the song.

Jonathan Coulton recorded the song "Je Suis Rick Springfield" about an American man trying to impress a French girl he just met in France by pretending to be Springfield. It was recorded in 2011 and appeared on the album Artificial Heart.

Discography

Filmography

Films

Television

Awards and nominations

Go-Set pop poll

The Go-Set pop poll was coordinated by teen-oriented pop music paper Go-Set. The paper was established in February 1966 and conducted an annual poll from 1966 to 1972 to determine the most popular personalities.

|-
| rowspan="2"| 1970 || rowspan="2" | Ricky Springfield || Best Guitarist || style="background:silver;"| 2nd
|-
| Best Composer || 5th
|-
| rowspan="2" | 1971 || rowspan="2"| himself || Best Guitarist || 
|-
| Best Songwriter/Composer || 4th
|-
| rowspan="5"| 1972
| rowspan="3"| himself
| Best Male
| style="background:tan;"| 3rd
|-
| Best Newcomer
| 4th
|-
| Best Songwriter/Composer
| style="background:silver;"| 2nd
|-
| Best Album
| Beginnings
| style="background:silver;"| 2nd
|-
| Best Single
| "Hooky Jo"
| 10th

King of Pop Awards
The King of Pop Awards were voted by the readers of TV Week. The award started in 1967 and ran through to 1978.

|-
| 1971
| himself
| Best Lead Guitarist
| 
|-
| 1972
| himself
| Most Popular Australian Musician
| 
|-

Grammy Awards

On 9 May 2014, Springfield was honoured with a star on the Hollywood Walk of Fame for his contributions to music.

References

External links

"An Affair of the Heart" documentary
Interview with Rick Springfield in the Pittsburgh Tribune-Review, May 2018

20th-century Australian male writers
20th-century Australian male singers
21st-century Australian male singers
20th-century Australian male actors
21st-century Australian male actors
21st-century Australian writers
1949 births
Australian expatriate male actors in the United States
Australian people of English descent
Australian male film actors
Australian male singer-songwriters
Australian male soap opera actors
Australian memoirists
Australian rock singers
Grammy Award winners
Living people
Male actors from Sydney
Singers from Sydney
Writers from Sydney
Frontiers Records artists
RCA Records artists
Capitol Records artists
Warner Records artists
The Red Locusts members
Zoot (band) members
People from Broadmeadows, Victoria